The 1924 Wimbledon Championships took place on the outdoor grass courts at the All England Lawn Tennis and Croquet Club in Wimbledon, London, United Kingdom. The tournament ran from 23 June until 5 July. It was the 44th staging of the Wimbledon Championships, and the second Grand Slam tennis event of 1924.

This edition saw the introduction of a draw that made use of a seeding list. The seeding was based on nationality and aimed at preventing nominated players from the same nationality meeting before the later rounds. A maximum of four players could be nominated by a country and these would be seeded into four different quarters of the draw. In 1927 the system of seeding by nationality was extended with a merit–based seeding based on the ranking of players.

Champions

Men's singles

 Jean Borotra defeated  René Lacoste, 6–1, 3–6, 6–1, 3–6, 6–4

Women's singles

 Kitty McKane defeated  Helen Wills, 4–6, 6–4, 6–4

Men's doubles

 Frank Hunter /  Vincent Richards defeated  Watson Washburn /  R. Norris Williams, 6–3, 3–6, 8–10, 8–6, 6–3

Women's doubles

 Hazel Wightman /  Helen Wills defeated  Phyllis Covell /  Kitty McKane, 6–4, 6–4

Mixed doubles

 John Gilbert /  Kitty McKane defeated  Leslie Godfree /  Dorothy Shepherd-Barron, 6–3, 3–6, 6–3

References

External links
 Official Wimbledon Championships website

 
Wimbledon Championships
Wimbledon Championships
Wimbledon Championships
Wimbledon Championships